Lukas Nola (31 March 1964 – 29 October 2022) was a Croatian film director and screenwriter.

sq:Lukas Nola

Filmography
 Dok nitko ne gleda (TV film, 1993)
 Each Time We Part Away (Svaki put kad se rastajemo, TV film, 1994)
 Russian Meat (Rusko meso, 1997)
 Celestial Body (Nebo, sateliti, 2000)
 Alone (Sami, 2001)
 True Miracle (Pravo čudo, 2007)
 Hush (Šuti, 2013)

References

External links

1964 births
2022 deaths
Croatian film directors
Croatian screenwriters
Film people from Zagreb
Vladimir Nazor Award winners
Golden Arena for Best Director winners